Eburodacrys perspicillaris is a species of beetle in the family Cerambycidae. It was described by Wilhelm Ferdinand Erichson in 1848.

References

Eburodacrys
Beetles described in 1848